Cambridge is a locality in the Shire of Richmond, Queensland, Australia.

Geography 
The Flinders River forms the southern boundary of the locality and Express Creek forms the eastern part of the northern boundary.

The land use is predominantly cattle grazing.

The Richmond–Croydon Road runs along the north-eastern boundary.

References 

Shire of Richmond
Localities in Queensland